To the Max is a 1982 album released by R&B band Con Funk Shun.

Track listing
 "Ms. Got-the-Body" – 3:51
 "Let's Ride and Slide" – 4:30
 "Everlove" – 4:06
 "Hide and Freak" – 4:23
 "You Are the One" – 3:38
 "Take It to the Max" – 5:01
 "Love's Train" – 5:12
 "Ain't Nobody Baby" – 5:32
 "T.H.E. Freak" – 4:23

Personnel

Con Funk Shun
Michael Vernon Cooper – lead and rhythm guitar, vocals
Karl Fuller – trumpet, flugelhorn, percussion, vocals
Paul Harrell – saxophone, flute, percussion, vocals
Cedric A Martin – bass guitar, vocals
Louis A. McCall, Sr. – drums, percussion, vocals
Felton Pilate – trombone, rhythm guitar, synthesizer, vocals
Danny A. Thomas – piano, clavinet, organ, synthesizer, vocals.

Charts

Album

Singles

References

External links
 Con Funk Shun-To The Max at Discogs

1982 albums
Con Funk Shun albums
Mercury Records albums